Robert Baynes may refer to:

 Robert Hall Baynes (1831–1895), bishop and hymn writer
 Robert Lambert Baynes (1796–1869), British Royal Navy admiral
 Robert Stuart Baynes (died 1902), British Army officer